is a Japanese former actress, television personality and gravure model from Nabari, Mie Prefecture. She worked under the Horipro talent agency.

Career 
Even though she had been featured as a guest or assistant in several shows during the 1990s and early 2000s, it was after the first Mōdoru Audition (a portmanteau of the words "Mode", "Model" and "Idol") in 2003 that she effectively broke into the world of entertainment. 
Since then she's been featured in several commercials (such as 7-Eleven or ECC), magazines and variety shows, as well as the 2007 Super Sentai Series Juken Sentai Gekiranger. As a gravure idol she's also released a photobook and three image DVDs, but she eventually retired in 2010 for unknown reasons.

Television 
 Juken Sentai Gekiranger as Ran Uzaki/Geki Yellow (2007)
 Garo (TV series) as Asami Shinohara (2005)

Film 
Juken Sentai Gekiranger: Nei-Nei! Hou-Hou! Hong Kong Decisive Battle as Ran Uzaki/Geki Yellow (2007)
Juken Sentai Gekiranger vs Boukenger as Ran Uzaki/Geki Yellow (2008)
Engine Sentai Go-onger vs. Gekiranger as Ran Uzaki/Geki Yellow (2009)

References
Mina Fukui at Horipro
Personal BBS

Japanese gravure models
Japanese television personalities
1984 births
People from Mie Prefecture
Living people